Rubberneck is the first studio album by American rock band Toadies. It was released in August 1994 on Interscope Records and attained RIAA gold and platinum status in December 1995 and December 1996 respectively. The album produced the band's most popular single, "Possum Kingdom".  The song's master track is featured in the Xbox 360 version of the video game Guitar Hero II. It was also released for the video game Rock Band 3 in a pack that contained "Away" and "Tyler" as well.

In 2014, in honor of the album's 20th anniversary, Kirtland Records re-released the album on CD and vinyl on April 1. The album was remastered and also includes five bonus tracks. Three of the bonus tracks are previously unreleased songs from the original album's sessions, including "Run in with Dad" and a cover of Pylon's "Stop It", both of which were previously recorded for Velvet, and "Rockfish", an early version of "Waterfall", a song later recorded for Feeler, the intended follow-up to Rubberneck. The other two bonus tracks are early live versions of "Possum Kingdom" and "Tyler", recorded at Trees Dallas on December 5, 1991. The vinyl only features the original 11 album tracks, and includes a download of the five bonus tracks.

Also in honor of the album's 20th anniversary, current band member Clark Vogeler made Dark Secrets: The Stories of Rubberneck, a 23-minute documentary about the album, featuring original behind-the-scenes footage recorded by Lisa Umbarger as well as newly recorded interviews. It was debuted on March 10, 2014 at The Kessler Theater in Dallas, TX. The documentary was then posted on the internet two days later.

Track listing

Personnel
Vaden Todd Lewis - Rhythm Guitar, Vocals
Darrel Herbert - Lead Guitar
Lisa Umbarger - Bass, Baritone Guitar
Mark Reznicek - Drums, Percussion
Sally Browder - Engineer
Tom Rothrock - Producer, Engineer
Rob Schnapf - Producer, Engineer
Andy Wallace - Mixing
Howie Weinberg - Mastering
Eric White - Mixing, Mixing Assistant
Michael Lavine - Photography

Chart positions

Weekly charts

Year-end charts

Singles

References

1994 debut albums
Toadies albums
Interscope Records albums
Albums produced by Tom Rothrock
Albums produced by Rob Schnapf